Amirabad (also Romanized as Amīrābād; also known as Amīrābād-e Salī Darreh) is a village in Kharqan District, Zarandieh County, Markazi Province, Iran. At the 2006 census, its population was 228, in 54 families.

References 

Populated places in Zarandieh County